The swimming competition at the 1959 Summer Universiade took place in Turin, Italy.

Men’s events

Women’s events

Medal table

References
Medalist Summary (Men) on GBRATHLETICS.com
Medalist Summary (Women) on GBRATHLETICS.com

Swimming at the Summer Universiade
Uni
1959 Summer Universiade